{{Infobox song
| name       = Family Tradition
| cover      = FamilyTradition-SenesFail.jpg
| alt        =
| type       = single
| artist     = Senses Fail
| album      = Life Is Not a Waiting Room
| A-side     = Family Tradition
| released   = August 25, 2008
| recorded   =
| studio     =
| venue      =
| genre      = Emo
| length     = 3:34
| label      = Vagrant
| writer     = James "Buddy" Nielsen, Senses Fail
| producer   = Brian McTernan
| prev_title = Can't Be Saved
| prev_year  = 2007
| next_title = '"Mi Amor"| next_year  = 2013
}}

"Family Tradition" is the first single and fourth song on Senses Fail's third studio album Life Is Not a Waiting Room. Family Tradition is the seventh single released from Senses Fail. It has become one of the band's most successful singles to date. It was released on iTunes on August 26, 2008."Release Details - Family Tradition iTunes EP"  Vagrant Records. Retrieved on August 27, 2008. "Family Tradition" was released to radio on October 7, 2008.

This song and others off the same album is featured in Senses Fail's greatest hits album entitled "Follow Your Bliss: The Best of Senses Fail''".

Lead singer Buddy Nielsen discusses the story behind the song:

A music video had been filmed for the song displaying a rather scrawny young boy who does not seem to add up to his father's expectations. Constantly harassed by his older brother throughout the video, he enters a chest in his room only to come out in the form of a large gremlin-looking character. The video ends with the transformed son frightening his parents in their sleep. Scenes of the band playing the song in front of an audience in a tent are intercut with the storyline of the video.

Track listing 
 "Family Tradition" – 3:34
 "Wolves At the Door" – 3:27
 "Life Is Not a Waiting Room" – 3:19
 "Waiting Room Album Clips" – 4:20

Personnel 
 Buddy Nielsen – Vocals
 Garrett Zablocki – Lead Guitar, Vocals
 Dan Trapp – Drums, percussion
 Heath Saraceno – Guitar, Vocals
 Jason Black (from Hot Water Music) – Bass guitar

References

External links 
"Family Tradition" music video on MTV.com

Songs about families
Senses Fail songs
2008 singles
2008 songs
Song recordings produced by Brian McTernan